The Roman Catholic Diocese of Santa María de Los Ángeles is a diocese located in the city of Los Ángeles in the Ecclesiastical province of Concepción in Chile.

History
 20 June 1959: Established as Diocese of Los Ángeles from the Metropolitan Archdiocese of Concepción and the Roman Catholic Diocese of Temuco

Bishops
 Bishops of Santa María de Los Ángeles (Roman rite), in reverse chronological order
 Bishop Felipe Bacarreza Rodríguez (2006.01.07 – present)
 Bishop Miguel Caviedes Medina (1994.02.19 – 2006.01.07)
 Bishop Adolfo Rodríguez Vidal (1988.07.06 – 1994.02.19)
 Bishop Orozimbo Fuenzalida y Fuenzalida (1970.02.26 – 1987.07.13), appointed Bishop of San Bernardo
 Bishop Alejandro Durán Moreira (1966.03.31 – 1970.02.02), appointed Bishop of Rancagua
 Bishop Luis Yáñez Ruiz Tagle (1964.03.21 – 1965.11.21)
 Bishop Manuel Sánchez Beguiristáin (1959.12.17 – 1963.05.30), appointed Archbishop of Concepción (Santissima Concezione)

Other priest of this diocese who became bishop
Francisco Javier Stegmeier Schmidlin, appointed Bishop of Villarrica

Sources
 GCatholic.org
 Catholic Hierarchy
 Diocese website

Roman Catholic dioceses in Chile
Christian organizations established in 1959
Roman Catholic dioceses and prelatures established in the 20th century
Los Angeles, Roman Catholic Diocese of
1959 establishments in Chile
Los Ángeles, Chile